"Money on You" is a song by American soul singer Chris Blue. It was Blue's coronation single following his victory on the twelfth season of the singing competition The Voice. The song was written by Mike Dupree, JHart, Scribz Riley, Talay Riley and Tinashe Sibanda.

Live performances
Blue performed the song live for the first time in the grand finale of The Voice on May 23, 2017.

Charts

Release history

References

2017 singles
2017 songs
Republic Records singles
Songs written by Talay Riley
Songs written by Tinashe Sibanda